Mesoborus crocodilus is a species of distichodontid fish found in the Congo River Basin in Middle Africa. It is the only member of its genus. It is a specialized fish-eater (not a fin-eater, as some of the relatives).

References

Distichodontidae
Monotypic fish genera
Congo drainage basin
Taxa named by Jacques Pellegrin
Freshwater fish of Central Africa